This list of fictional countries groups fictional countries and imagined nations together, by the region of the world in which they are supposed to be located.

Africa
 Bahari: North African country from Scorpion
 Beninia: African nation from Stand on Zanzibar
 Bozatta: African nation from Scorpion
 Buranda: African nation from Yes Minister
 Carbombya, Socialist Democratic Federated Republic of: North African country from Transformers
 Clonka Minkus: African country created by British animator David Firth for his series The News Hasn't Happened Yet.
 Dahomalia: African nation from Stand on Zanzibar
 Democratic Republic of Dahum: African nation from James Bond novel Solo
 Gafir: A fictional nation situated at the cross roads of the red sea, littered with desert, once under British rule until the year 1950, was created as an April Fools' Day joke as Instagram’s country of the day in 2018. 
 Gindra: East African country from Metal Gear: Ghost Babel
 Kangan: African nation from Anthills of the Savannah
 Sangala: West African country from 24
 Wakanda: Small African nation featured in the Marvel Comics series The Avengers. The nation is ruled by King T'Challa, also known as the superhero Black Panther.
 See Fictional African countries.

Americas
 See Fictional American countries.

Antarctica
Hili-liland: a nation near the South Pole, founded by Ancient Romans, in the 1899 novel A Strange Discovery by Charles Romeyn Dake. It is south of Tsalal and has a more developed civilization. It consists of Hili-li City on Hili-li Island, along with some outlying island colonies.
Leaphigh, Leaplow, Leapup, Leapdown, Leapover, Leapthrough, Leaplong, Leapshort, Leapround, Leapunder: ten independent kingdoms in the Antarctic archipelago of the Leap Islands, in the 1835 novel The Monikins by James Fenimore Cooper
Tsalal: an island in the 1838 novel The Narrative of Arthur Gordon Pym by Edgar Allan Poe and its 1897 sequel An Antarctic Mystery by Jules Verne. It has a tribal society led by a chief, Too-Wit.

Asia
 See Fictional Asian countries.

Oceania
BabaKiueria: a country in Australia in the film BabaKiueria
Erewhon (anagram of nowhere): in the novel Erewhon by Samuel Butler
Wirrawee: In The Tomorrow series by John Marsden
Wumpa Islands: an archipelago southeast of Australia in the Crash Bandicoot video games series.

Europe

Island nations

Antarctic
Hili-liland: a nation near the South Pole, founded by Ancient Romans, in the 1899 novel A Strange Discovery by Charles Romeyn Dake. It is south of Tsalal and has a more developed civilization. It consists of Hili-li City on Hili-li Island, along with some outlying island colonies.
Leaphigh, Leaplow, Leapup, Leapdown, Leapover, Leapthrough, Leaplong, Leapshort, Leapround, Leapunder: ten independent kingdoms in the Antarctic archipelago of the Leap Islands, in the 1835 novel The Monikins by James Fenimore Cooper

Atlantic
Birdwell Island: de facto independent island community in the Clifford the Big Red Dog series similar in geography and custom to an islands off of the east coast of the United States.
Fröland: Island in the North Sea in the Dutch TV series Fröland - country?
Islandia: self-isolated country in Austin Tappan Wright's novel Islandia
Sahrani: Atlantic island divided into the northern communist Democratic Republic of Sahrani and the oil-rich democratic monarchy of the Kingdom of South Sahrani in the video game Armed Assault

Caribbean
Barclay Islands (the Barclays): British-dependent Caribbean archipelago off the Bahamas embroiled in conflict between Castro's Cuba and the drug trade in Frederick Forsyth's novel The Deceiver.
Booty Island: a pirate island in the Caribbean Sea in the game Monkey Island 2: LeChuck's Revenge, part of the Tri-Island area (governed by Elaine Marley)
Cascara: a tiny Caribbean island in the movie Water
Cayuna: an imaginary Caribbean island modelled on Jamaica in the novels of John Hearne
Crab Island: poor Caribbean island shaped like a crab, under the domination of Crocodile Island, in the Patrouille des Castors comics
Crocodile Island: Caribbean island shaped like a crocodile, with a dictatorial government which seems to be heavily influenced by Tahiti, in the Patrouille des Castors comics
Jambalaya Island: an ex-pirate island in the Caribbean, turned to a tourist attraction center, in Escape from Monkey Island
Mêlée Island: a pirate island in the Caribbean Sea, from the Monkey Island games, part of the Tri-Island area (governed by Elaine Marley)
Phatt Island: an island in the Caribbean in the game Monkey Island 2: LeChuck's Revenge
Plunder Island: a pirate island in the Caribbean in the game The Curse of Monkey Island, part of the Tri-Island area (governed by Elaine Marley)
Porto Santo: a tiny island nation in Latin America visited by Steve Urkel in the Family Matters episode "South of the Border" (Note: Porto Santo is a real island of Madeira Archipelago)
Sacramento: a Caribbean Island from Érico Veríssimo's  novel, O Senhor Embaixador (The Ambassador), heavily based on Cuba.
San Lorenzo: a tiny, rocky island nation located in the Caribbean Sea in Kurt Vonnegut's Cat's Cradle
San Marcos (2): Caribbean island from an episode of The A-Team
San Monique: Caribbean nation run by a drug lord in the James Bond movie Live and Let Die
Santa Costa: Caribbean island dictatorship from the pilot episode of Mission: Impossible. Appears to lie somewhere between Cuba and the Venezuelan coast on a map seen–briefly–at the start of the episode.
Scabb Island: an anarchic pirate island in the Caribbean in the game Monkey Island 2: LeChuck's Revenge
Skull Island (2): a small pirate island in the Caribbean in the game The Curse of Monkey Island
Tropico: island nation in the Caribbean in the Tropico computer game

Indian Ocean
Blefuscu: a land where all the people are tiny from the book Gulliver's Travels by Jonathan Swift. Enemies of Lilliput
Genosha: an island nation which was established as a mutant homeland in Marvel Comics
Houyhnhnms Land: a land where horses rule. The animalistic human-like creatures in this land are called Yahoos. From the book Gulliver's Travels by Jonathan Swift.
Ishkebar: small island nation between India and Thailand from The Suite Life of Zack and Cody TV series, episode "Boston Holiday"
Javasu: an island in the Indian Ocean, the alleged country of "Princess Caraboo"
Lilliput: a land where all the people are tiny from the book Gulliver's Travels by Jonathan Swift
Pala: island utopia in Aldous Huxley's Island
Saint Georges Island: an island nation located somewhere in the Arabian Sea. It was the centrepoint of the episode A Victory for Democracy from the sitcom, Yes, Prime Minister.
Skull Island: from King Kong movie(s)
Taprobane: a country described as "about ninety percent congruent with the island of Ceylon (now Sri Lanka)" from Arthur C. Clarke's The Fountains of Paradise

Mediterranean
Al Amarja: Mediterranean island state in the Over the Edge roleplaying game
Barataria: island kingdom, presumably somewhere in the Mediterranean. The setting for Act II of the operetta The Gondoliers, by Gilbert and Sullivan.
Mervo: an island principality in the Mediterranean in the novel The Prince and Betty by P. G. Wodehouse
Mypos: island nation around the Greek isles, home of Balki from Perfect Strangers
Pathos: neighbor of Mypos, part of a different Tri-Island Area in Perfect Strangers
Skeptos: neighbor of Mypos, part of a different Tri-Island Area in Perfect Strangers

Pacific
Baki: homeland of Omio in Madeleine L'Engle's writing, a small Pacific island nation once dominated by British
Balnibarbi: land containing the metropolis called Lagado from the book Gulliver's Travels by Jonathan Swift
Bensalem: utopian island nation located somewhere off the Western coast of the continent of America from Francis Bacon's The New Atlantis
Caspak: a huge island country located in the South seas somewhere between South America and Australia from Edgar Rice Burroughs' The Land That Time Forgot and its sequels
Eleutheria: an island nation in the Southwest Pacific Ocean from the Eleutheria Model Parliament role playing game.
Glubbdubdrib: an island governed by a tribe of magicians. About one third the size of the Isle of Wight. From the book Gulliver's Travels by Jonathan Swift.
Kinakuta (Queenah-Kootah): island state from Neal Stephenson's novels Cryptonomicon and The Baroque Cycle
Luggnagg: an island state about 100 leagues SE from Japan. From the book Gulliver's Travels by Jonathan Swift.
Nuku'la Atoll: An archipelago in the South Pacific and former colony of the French colonial empire featured in San Sombrèro: A Land of Carnivals, Cocktails and Coups.
Patusan: an island nation somewhere in the South China Sea in the movie Surf Ninjas as well as in the film The Last Electric Knight and the TV series Sidekicks. Also mentioned in Lord Jim by Joseph Conrad. ????
Taka-Tuka-Land: Astrid Lindgren's book about Pippi Longstocking mentions a travel to this country in the third book of the series. Pippi's father was a king there in the South Sea.
Toga Toga Islands: South Pacific island nation featured on The A-Team
Vanutu: a tiny South Pacific nation consisting of four atolls from the novel State of Fear by Michael Crichton

Other or uncertain
Aquabania: an idyllic island, the supposed home of The Aquabats
Cacklogallinia: a kingdom off the coast of South America, from A Voyage to Cacklogallinia by Captain Samuel Brunt
Cap'D'Far: a small island country from an episode of Scarecrow and Mrs. King whose only export was fish bones
Dinotopia: a hidden, utopian island from James Gurney's illustrated books
Flyspeck Island: home of Gunk in the comic strip Curtis -- country?
Huella Islands: islands off the coast of Cayenne, mentioned in the Hardy Boys books. They are ruled by dictator Juan Posada and their "spy chief" is named Bedoya. The adjective is Huellan.
Istan: an island state in the online role-playing game, Guild Wars Nightfall
Lucre Island: a pirate island in the game, Escape from Monkey Island
Malevelosia: an island kingdom filled with supervillains in Justice Squad
Mardi archipelago: from Herman Melville's Mardi and a Voyage Thither
Mesa de Oro: unstable Latin American island in the Three Young Investigators series. (The name means "golden table" in Spanish.)
Nollop: island state from the novel Ella Minnow Pea by Mark Dunn
San Cristobel: tropical island country in The Guiding Light TV series, also the name for a separate fictional nation in the TV series Automan
San Esperito: South American island nation from the video game Just Cause. Translated in English means "St. espionage".
Pokoponesia: island nation from the animated version of The Tick

Transcontinental
Holy Britannian Empire: A country based in North America which controls the whole Americas, Japan, New Zealand, and parts of the Middle East. From the Japanese anime franchise Code Geass
Eurasia: from the novel Nineteen Eighty-Four by George Orwell
Oceania: from the novel Nineteen Eighty-Four by George Orwell
United Americas: A conglomerate of North and Latin America mentioned in the Alien series.
Yukon Confederacy: a country in the novel Fitzpatrick's War by Theodore Judson, which includes North America, Great Britain, and Australia.

Uncertain
Agraria: Eastern country in the film You Know What Sailors Are
Altruria: utopian country from William Dean Howells' A Traveler from Altruria
Anemia: a country in the film Hot Stuff. Bears the same name as the medical condition.
Ancapistan: a Libertarian utopia created by anarcho capitalists
Angria: imaginary country from the poems of the Brontë sisters.
Arcacia: mythical kingdom in the film A Royal Family
Ardistan: from the novel Ardistan and Dschinnistan by Karl Friedrich May
Aslan: from anime Area 88. Sometimes also transliterated Asran.
Auspasia: the noisiest and most talkative nation in the world; appears in Georges Duhamel's Lettres d'Auspasie and La dernier voyage de Candide
Bahavia: country where Meena Paroom's father is the ambassador in the Disney Channel series, "Cory In The House".
Bahkan: a nation threatened by the Federated Peoples' Republic in the Mission: Impossible TV episode "Fool's Gold"
Borginia: a republic from the videogame Dino Crisis. It also appears in Apollo Justice: Ace Attorney and Ace Attorney Investigations: Miles Edgeworth, in which it is stated as being in northern Europe.
Bregna: a centralized scientific planned state from the animated series Aeon Flux
Bukistan: an Islamic country in the Cary Grant movie Dream Wife. Later referred to in I dream of Jeannie.
Calia: from Modesty Blaise episode "The Jericho Caper"
Candover: medieval country in the novel Rats and Gargoyles by Mary Gentle
Celama, Kingdom of: mythical land where inhabitants fight for survival as a challenge to their dignity in novels El reino de Celama by Luis Mateo Díez
Chekia: mythical kingdom in the film The Only Thing
Chernarus: post-soviet Republic from the game DayZ and ArmA 2
Coronia: a kingdom from the film King, Queen and Joker
Danu: setting of Timothy Mo's 1991 novel The Redundancy of Courage, based on East Timor
Derkaderkastan: from the film Team America: World Police
Dschinnistan (Djinnistan): in the novel Ardistan and Dschinnistan by Karl Friedrich May
Eastern Coalition of Nations: in Star Trek: First Contact, the Eastern Coalition of Nations (ECON) was one of the major powers involved in World War III
Ecuarico: homeland of an exiled dictator in an episode of Gilligan's Island
Eretz: home of a visiting prime minister, Salka Palmir, in an episode of The Six Million Dollar Man ('Eretz' is Hebrew for 'land')
Far Eastern Republic: a nation from the Mission: Impossible TV episode "Commandante"
Federated Peoples' Republic: a nation hostile toward the Kingdom of Bahkan in the Mission: Impossible TV episode "Fool's Gold". Possibly the same as the Federated People's Republic: from the Mission: Impossible TV episode "Time Bomb".
Filemonia: one of the countries resulting of the 1991 collapse of USSR as told in Mortadelo y Filemón: El 35 Aniversario
Findas: country sunk under the waves in The Book of Conquests by Jim Fitzpatrick
Forest Kingdom: from Simon Green's Blue Moon Rising. Ruled by King John.
Freiland: from Freiland by Theodor Hertzka
Gavel: the republic in the animated picture Ghost in the Shell
Gnubia: from television series MacGyver
Gondour: an ideal republic imagined by Mark Twain in his short story The Curious Republic of Gondour.
Guamania: from the French-Canadian series Dans une Galaxie près de chez vous
Guravia: a country where the first robot president was elected in the Astro Boy animated series
Gzbfernigambia: a kingdom from the film Such a Little Queen
Herland: in the novel Herland by Charlotte Perkins Gilman
Hetland: a kingdom from the film Such a Little Queen
Hillsdown: duchy in Simon Green's Blue Moon Rising. Ruled by Duke Alaric.
Inguanaguay: Fictional country in Disney cartoon The Replacements.
Kabulstan: a xenophobic third world military dictatorship in an episode of MacGyver
Kafaristan: from William Rose Benét's children's book The Flying King of Kurio
Kajsa (Casha, Kasha): a sultanate, neighbor to Basenji from the sitcom I Dream of Jeannie
Kamburu: totalitarian desert nation secretly ruled by a fugitive alien, based on Iraq or Libya, in the comic book mini-series JLA: Destiny
Kampong: from the novel The Thirteen-Gun Salute by Patrick O'Brian
Kazahrus: an absolute monarchy known for Human Rights violations from the third season of Blindspot
Kekistan: based on the word "Kek", a variant of the acronym “LOL” (laugh out loud).
Klopstockia: from the W. C. Fields film Million Dollar Legs
Kreplakistan: Soviet Republic from the Austin Powers films, likely based on the real Karakalpak Autonomous Soviet Socialist Republic, now the Republic of Karakalpakstan, and "kreplach" – Eastern European Jewish dish consisting of meat-filled dumplings.
Kumrahn: see Qumran
Kumor:The diaries of Kumor
Kurio: from William Rose Benét's children's book The Flying King of Kurio
Khurland: mythical kingdom in the film A Royal Family (but see Courland)
Lands Beyond: setting in Norton Juster's The Phantom Tollbooth
Libria: a totalitarian state in the movie Equilibrium
Litzenburg: neutral country in the Border Zone computer game
Lividia: mythical kingdom in the film Greater Than a Crown
Loompaland: a "terrible" country from Roald Dahl's 1964 children's book, Charlie and the Chocolate Factory. It is inhabited by dwarves called Oompa Loompas and is full of extremely dangerous creatures called Snozzwangers, Hornswogglers, Vermicious Knids, and wicked Whangdoodles.
Low countries: from Simon Green's Beyond the Blue Moon. Capital city: Haven.
Lukano: a small independent country facing the Mediterranean Sea from Time Crisis 3 video game. It neighbors Astigos, a small, peaceful island in the Mediterranean Sea.
Macaria: utopian country from A Description of the Famous Kingdom of Macaria (1641), published by Samuel Hartlib, now attributed to Gabriel Plattes
Malicuria: a monarchy run by Emperor Aleister, while Princess Mallory is his daughter, from the episode "April's Fool" of the 1987-1996 Teenage Mutant Ninja Turtles cartoon TV series. The episode is set on the Malicurian embassy in the United States.
Mandavia: a kingdom in the film Speed King
Marnsburg: a member of the United Nations hostile to the United States in the Mission: Impossible TV episode "Imitation"
Monica: an anarchist state from the animated series Aeon Flux
Morevana: a kingdom in which fat is prized in the film The Slim Princess
Moribundia: from Patrick Hamilton's Impromptu in Moribundia
Mortadelonia: one of the countries resulting of the 1991 collapse of USSR as told in Mortadelo y Filemón: El 35 Aniversario
Isle of Naboombu: kingdom of anthropomorphic animals in the Disney film Bedknobs and Broomsticks
New Swissland: Nation southwest of Greenland in the Captain Underpants series. Every person born in this country is given a ridiculous name at birth.
Nivia: from the Photon TV series
Nordenija: republic created by British artist Chris Shade
Norgborg: Small nation located within the Arctic Circle, featured in San Sombrèro: A Land of Carnivals, Cocktails and Coups.
Nouvelle Atlantide or New Atlantis: a huge, rich, powerful, and very far from peaceful nation in Anatole France's Penguin Island. Similar to the United States. 
Opperland: a fictitious country based on the Netherlands where the Dutch language is treated entertainingly, 
Oriosa: Tarrant Hawkin's home country in Michael A. Stackpole's series The Dragon Crown War Cycle.
Ostnitz: country from the Border Zone computer game
The Land of Oz: L. Frank Baum's Oz books as well as the novel and play Wicked and its sequels.
Perusalem: land ruled by The Inca of Perusalem in the short satiric play by George Bernard Shaw
Petoria: from the "E. Peterbus Unum" episode of Family Guy
Pianostan: a country once visited by Inspector Gadget where its people remain happy so long as their King remains miserable
Pomerania: a nation in the film Anchors Aweigh. It has a navy which accepts non-Pomeranians. Not to be confused with the real Pomerania, formerly a region of Prussia.
Radiata: Home country in Radiata Stories
Realia: a republic in the Boiling Point video game
La Republica de las Bananas (literally, "banana republic"): from the board game Junta
Riallaro archipelago: from Godfrey Sweven's Riallaro, the Archipelago of Exiles
Rolisica: country in the film Mothra most likely a disguise of the United States. Capital city: New Kirk.
San Gordio: a kingdom in the film The Cowboy Prince
San Pedro: from the Sherlock Holmes story "The Adventure of Wisteria Lodge"
Sercia: a republic in Time Crisis video game
Serena Republic: a small country mentioned in the Metal Gear Acid 2 video game
Tanah Masa: from Karel Čapek's War with the Newts
Taronia: from the film Thirty Day Princess
Tawaki: from the film Man of the Moment
Termina: the country in which The Legend of Zelda: Majora's Mask takes place.
Tirania (also Republic of Tirania): country governed by dictator Bruteztrausen; Spanish secret agents Mortadelo and Filemón helped depose Bruteztrausen and president Rompetechen was then elected.
Tontecarlo: a gambler's paradise in Superlópez comic-books until Superlópez's tourism visit. Clearly based on Monte Carlo; "Tonte" refers to Spanish word tonto (=fool).
Trobokistan: former Soviet satellite nation in Totally Spies! TV series
Ünderland: a small duchy bordering Michigan, from The Venture Bros. animated TV series. Formerly ruled by supervillain Baron Ünderbheit, now a democracy under the presidency of Girl Hitler.
Unistat: analogue of the United States in the Schrödinger's Cat trilogy of Robert Anton Wilson
The United States of Anatidae: Duckworld equivalent of the United States in the film Howard the Duck.
Valaria: a kingdom in the film The Colonel of the Red Hussars
Valeria: Spanish speaking democracy from Mission: Impossible episode "Wheels"
Valeska: a tropical country from the Three Stooges short Saved by the Belle
Vambria: an Arctic communist dictatorship on the 1990s Disney animated TV series TaleSpin
Vandreka: see Bandrika
Versovia: dictatorship from Australian children's miniseries Eugenie Sandler P.I. from ABC Kids
Volsinia: the country with unknown location in Frritt-Flacc by Jules Verne
Yudonia: a country mentioned in the episode "We're Married" from Drake & Josh sitcom. Very similar to countries like Russia, Ukraine, Belarus, Latvia, Estonia and Lithuania.
Zagorias Federation: Mediterranean country, featured in Time Crisis 3 video game, which invades Astigos, a small island, a territory of the neighbouring nation of Lukano
Zanzibar Land: sole nuclear power in the Metal Gear series of video games

Pun-based names
Anvillania: a country where the Warner Brothers and Sisters were declared royalty in Animaniacs
Applesauce Lorraine: a country, stated to be bordered by France and Baja California, from Rocky and Bullwinkle's epic "The Three Moosketeers". It is a parody of the region of Alsace-Lorraine.
Backhairistan: from The Adventures of Jimmy Neutron: Boy Genius animated TV series
Brainania: from the animated series Pinky and the Brain
Brutopia: country appearing in several Donald Duck stories, possibly referring to the Soviet Union
Contraria: from the series WordGirl is the homeland of Nocan the Contrarian.
Double Crossia: a country mentioned in the Three Stooges short You Nazty Spy
Elbonia: Eastern European country from the comic strip Dilbert
Jumbostan and Unsteadystan: from the world of Donald Duck
Lower Slobbovia: ice-covered wasteland from the comic strip Li'l Abner
North Elbonia: A Communist neighbour of Elbonia (see above); loosely based on North Korea.
San Glucos: from The Simpsons episode "Sweets and Sour Marge"
Yurp: a poor country depicted in I Am Weasel animated TV series (pun on "Europe")
Zombikistan: possibly Eastern European country mentioned in MadWorld as being the original location of Mad Castle and whose major export is apparently zombies.

References

Fictional countries